Campyloxenus is a bioluminescent genus of click beetles in the family Elateridae, and is the sole member of the subfamily Campyloxeninae. There is one described species in Campyloxenus, Campyloxenus pyrothorax.

References

Elateridae
Elateridae genera
Monotypic Elateriformia genera
Taxa described in 1860
Bioluminescent insects